Lukas Pusch (born 1970) is an Austrian artist based in Vienna and Siberia.
He studied painting at the University of Applied Arts Vienna, Surikov Institut in Moscow and the Dresden Academy of Fine Arts.

Works
Pusch artworks includes paintings, objects, films and performances. 2007 he founded SLUM-TV together with Sam Hopkins and Alexander Nikolic in Mathare. 2008 he opened the White Cube Gallery Novosibirsk. It was the first and in that time only center of contemporary art in Siberia in form of an iron garage.

Solo exhibitions (selection)
 2011: „Neues Tahiti", Galerie Ernst Hilger, Vienna
 2011: „Die PRESSE Mappe", Albertina
 2009: „Kaiserwalzer", Buchhandlung Walther König, MQ, Vienna
 2008: „Hommage an Bianca Lehrer", Galerie Phillip Konzett, Vienna
 2008: „Kaiserwalzer", Kunst und Antiquitätenmesse, Hofburg, Vienna
 2007: „Vienna Voodoo", Galerie Phillip Konzett, Vienna
 2006: „5 Jahre kein Sex", SWINGR, raumaufzeit, Vienna
 2005: „Neue Arbeiten", endart, Berlin
 2005: „Berliner Mappe", Buchhandlung Walther König, Cologne

Group exhibitions (selection)
 2011: „Schöne Aussichten", House on the Embankment, special project of the 4th Moscow Biennale curated by Simon Mraz and Peter Weibel
 2010: „Lebt und arbeitet in Wien III", Kunsthalle Wien
 2009: „Fake Reality", Donaufestival, Krems
 2009: 7th Krasnojarsk Museums Biennale
 2008: „Kunscht isch gäng es Risiko", Kunsthalle Luzern
 2007: 5th International Graphic art Biennale Nowosibirsk
 2006: „Economy Class", Alliance francaise de Nairobi, Kenya

Publications and catalogues
 „Kunst und Politik", Samizdat, Vienna 1996
 „CRASH", Verlag der Buchhandlung Walther König, Cologne 2008
 „Afrika", Verlag der Buchhandlung Walther König, Cologne 2008
 „Kaiserwalzer", Verlag der Buchhandlung Walther König, Cologne 2009
 „Lukas Pusch 2", Galerie Ernst Hilger, 2010

Selected works in public collections
 Albertina, Vienna; Wien Museum, Vienna.

References

External links
 Webpräsenz von Lukas Pusch
 Works by Lukas Pusch at Galerie Ernst Hilger, Verlag der Buchhandlung Walther König and Bibliothek der Universität für angewandte Kunst Wien

1970 births
Living people
Austrian artists
Conceptual artists